= Readmission of states =

Readmission of states may refer to:

- Readmission of seceded states to the United States in the reconstruction era
- Readmission of states as member states of the United Nations after suspension, expulsion or withdrawal
